This is a list of by-elections to the Legislative Assembly and the Legislative Council of the Falkland Islands. The Legislative Council of the Falkland Islands was founded on 13 November 1845, originally as an entirely appointed body. The first elections to the council took place in 1949. The Legislative Assembly replaced the Legislative Council with the implementation of the new Constitution on 1 January 2009.

The Legislative Assembly consists of eight elected members, five from Stanley and three from Camp. Under section 32(2) of the constitution, if an elected member of the Legislative Assembly vacates their seat for any reason other than a dissolution of the Assembly, there is a by-election to fill the empty seat. The by-election must be held within 70 days of the vacancy occurring, unless the Assembly is due to be dissolved within 126 days.

Legislative Assembly
The first election to the newly constituted Legislative Assembly took place on 5 November 2009 and the assembly was dissolved on 17 October 2013 in preparation for the 2013 general election.

Stanley, December 2011
Emma Edwards, MLA for Stanley, resigned from the Legislative Assembly on 21 October 2011 following her decision to leave the Falklands. Her seat was filled by Dr Barry Elsby in a by-election on 15 December 2011.

Camp, 2011
Bill Luxton, MLA for Camp, resigned from the Legislative Assembly on 4 November 2011 due to his prologued absence from the Falklands, which was increasing the workload of the other MLAs. The seat was filled by Ian Hansen, who was the only candidate when nominations closed on 30 November 2011.

Stanley, June 2011
Glenn Ross, MLA for Stanley, resigned from the Legislative Assembly on 26 April 2011 in order to concentrate on his work at the islands' power station. His seat was filled by former MLA, Mike Summers in a by-election on 23 June 2011.

Legislative Council

Stanley, 2008
A by-election took place in the Stanley constituency on 3 January 2008 after the incumbent councillor, Richard Davies, became Chief Medical Officer. There was controversy over the circumstances that led to the by-election as Richard Davies had been advised by the Government that he could take on the office of Chief Medical Officer without forfeiting his seat in the Legislative Council. However, this was later deemed to be unconstitutionally, forcing Davies to give up his seat. Davies sought re-election at the by-election, but lost out to John Birmingham. This was the last election to the Legislative Council prior to it being reconstituted into the Legislative Assembly on 1 January 2009.

Camp, 2003
A by-election took place in the Camp constituency on 6 November 2003 following the resignation of the incumbent councillor, Philip Miller. The seat was filled by Ian Hansen.

Stanley, 1996
A by-election took place in the Stanley constituency in October 1996 following the resignation of the incumbent councillor, John Cheek. The seat was filled by Mike Summers.

Stanley, 1994
A by-election took place in the Stanley constituency on 15 December 1994 following the resignation of the incumbent councillor, Charles Kennleyside. The seat was filled by John Birmingham.

Stanley, 1987
A by-election took place in the Stanley constituency on 29 January 1987 following the resignation of the incumbent councillor, Norma Edwards. The seat was filled by Terry Betts.

Camp, 1986
A by-election was called for the Camp constituency on 16 April 1986 following the resignation of the incumbent councillor, Timothy John Durose Miller. Miller sought re-election himself, but lost to Eric Miller Goss.

Stanley, 1984
A by-election was called for the Stanley constituency on 5 November 1984 following the resignation of the incumbent councillor, Terence John Peck. The seat was filled by Harold Bennett.

West Falkland, 1980
A by-election was called for the West Falkland constituency in 1980 following the resignation of the incumbent councillor, Derek Stanley Evans. The seat was filled by John Richard Rowlands.

Stanley, 1962
A by-election was called for the Stanley constituency in 1962 following the death of the incumbent councillor, Arthur Leslie Hardy, on 6 February 1962. The seat was filled by John Richard Rowlands.

References

By-elections
By-elections
By-elections in British Overseas Territories
By-elections
Falkland Islands
By-elections
British Overseas Territories politics-related lists